Pankiewicz is surname of:
 Józef Pankiewicz (1866–1940), a Polish painter, graphic artist, and pedagogue
 Tadeusz Pankiewicz (1908 in Samborz – 1993), a Polish Righteous among the Nations

Polish-language surnames